The Fjölnir men's basketball, commonly known as Fjölnir, is the men's basketball department of Ungmennafélagið Fjölnir multi-sport club. It is based in Grafarvogur, Reykjavík. As of the 2019-2020 season it plays in the Úrvalsdeild karla.

Titles and awards

Titles
2. deild karla:
Winners (2): 2002

Individual awards

Úrvalsdeild Men's Young Player of the Year
Ægir Steinarsson - 2010, 2011
Hörður Axel Vilhjálmsson - 2006

Úrvalsdeild Men's Coach of the Year
Benedikt Guðmundsson - 2005

1. deild karla Domestic Player of the Year
Róbert Sigurðsson - 2019

1. deild karla Domestic All-First team
Haukur Helgi Pálsson - 2009
Róbert Sigurðsson - 2016, 2017, 2019
Sigvaldi Eggertsson - 2018
Ægir Þór Steinarsson - 2009

1. deild karla Coach of the Year
Bárður Eyþórsson - 2010

Notable players

Coaches
 Pétur Karl Guðmundsson 2000
 Benedikt Guðmundsson 2003–2006
 Keith Vassell 2006
 Bárður Eyþórsson 2006–2010
 Tómas Holton 2010
 Örvar Þór Kristjánsson 2010–2012
 Hjalti Þór Vilhjálmsson 2012–2017
 Falur Harðarson 2017–2020
 Halldór Karl Þórsson 2020–2022
 Borce Ilievski 2022–present

References

External sites
Team profile at kki.is

Fjölnir (basketball)